Amazon.com, Inc. is an American multinational technology company focusing on e-commerce, cloud computing, online advertising, digital streaming, and artificial intelligence. It has been referred to as "one of the most influential economic and cultural forces in the world", and is one of the world's most valuable brands. It is one of the Big Five American information technology companies, alongside Alphabet (Google), Apple, Meta (Facebook), and Microsoft.

Amazon was founded by Jeff Bezos from his garage in Bellevue, Washington, on July 5, 1994. Initially an online marketplace for books, it has expanded into a multitude of product categories, a strategy that has earned it the moniker The Everything Store. It has multiple subsidiaries including Amazon Web Services (cloud computing), Zoox (autonomous vehicles), Kuiper Systems (satellite Internet), and Amazon Lab126 (computer hardware R&D). Its other subsidiaries include Ring, Twitch, IMDb, and Whole Foods Market. Its acquisition of Whole Foods in August 2017 for 13.4 billion substantially increased its footprint as a physical retailer.

Amazon has earned a reputation as a disruptor of well-established industries through technological innovation and "aggressive" reinvestment of profits into capital expenditures. , it is the world's largest online retailer and marketplace, smart speaker provider, cloud computing service through AWS, live-streaming service through Twitch, and Internet company as measured by revenue and market share. In 2021, it surpassed Walmart as the world's largest retailer outside of China, driven in large part by its paid subscription plan, Amazon Prime, which has over 200 million subscribers worldwide. It is the second-largest private employer in the United States.

Amazon also distributes a variety of downloadable and streaming content through its Amazon Prime Video, Amazon Music, Twitch, and Audible units. It publishes books through its publishing arm, Amazon Publishing, film and television content through Amazon Studios, and has been the owner of film and television studio Metro-Goldwyn-Mayer since March 2022. It also produces consumer electronics—most notably, Kindle e-readers, Echo devices, Fire tablets, and Fire TVs.

Amazon has been criticized for customer data collection practices, a toxic work culture, tax avoidance, and anti-competitive behavior.

History

1994–2006: Early years 
Amazon was founded on July 5, 1994, by Jeff Bezos, who chose the Seattle area for its abundance of technical talent, as Microsoft was in the area.

Amazon went public in May 1997. It began selling music and videos in 1998, and began international operations by acquiring online sellers of books in the United Kingdom and Germany. The following year, it began selling music, video games, consumer electronics, home improvement items, software, games, and toys.

In 2002, it launched Amazon Web Services (AWS), which initially focused on providing APIs for web developers to build web applications on top of Amazon's ecommerce platform. In 2004, AWS was expanded to provide website popularity statistics and web crawler data from the Alexa Web Information Service. AWS later shifted toward providing enterprise services with Simple Storage Service (S3) in 2006, and Elastic Compute Cloud (EC2) in 2008, allowing companies to rent data storage and computing power from Amazon. In 2006, Amazon also launched the Fulfillment by Amazon program, which allowed individuals and small companies (called "third-party sellers") to sell products through Amazon's warehouses and fulfillment infrastructure.

2007–present: Growth 
Amazon purchased the Whole Foods Market supermarket chain in 2017.

During the COVID-19 pandemic, Amazon introduced a hazard pay of $2-per-hour, changes to overtime pay, and a policy of unlimited, unpaid time off until April 30, 2020. The hazard pay increase expired in June 2020, and the paid time-off policy in May 2022. Amazon also introduced temporary restrictions on the sale of non-essential goods, and hired 100,000 more staff in the US and Canada. Some Amazon workers in the US, France, and Italy protested the company's decision to "run normal shifts" despite many positive COVID-19 cases. In Spain, the company has faced legal complaints over its policies. A group of US Senators wrote an open letter to Bezos in March 2020, expressing concerns about worker safety.

On February 2, 2021, Amazon announced that Jeff Bezos would step down as CEO to become executive chair of Amazon's board in Q3 of 2021. Andy Jassy, previously CEO of AWS, became Amazon's CEO. In January 2023, Amazon announced job cuts for over 18,000 workers, in an attempt to cut costs.

Products and services

Amazon.com  

Amazon.com is an ecommerce platform that sells many product lines, including media (books, movies, music, and software), apparel, baby products, consumer electronics, beauty products, gourmet food, groceries, health and personal care products, industrial & scientific supplies, kitchen items, jewelry, watches, lawn and garden items, musical instruments, sporting goods, tools, automotive items, toys and games, and farm supplies and consulting services. Amazon websites are country-specific (for example, amazon.com for the U.S. and amazon.fr for France), though some offer international shipping.

Visits to amazon.com grew from 615 million annual visitors in 2008, to more than 2 billion per month in 2022. The ecommerce platform is the 14th most visited website in the world.

Results generated by Amazon's search engine are partly determined by promotional fees. The company's localized storefronts, which differ in selection and prices, are differentiated by top-level domain and country code:

Merchant partnerships 
In 2000, U.S. toy retailer Toys "R" Us entered into a 10-year agreement with Amazon, valued at $50 million per year plus a cut of sales, under which Toys "R" Us would be the exclusive supplier of toys and baby products on the service, and the chain's website would redirect to Amazon's Toys & Games category. In 2004, Toys "R" Us sued Amazon, claiming that because of a perceived lack of variety in Toys "R" Us stock, Amazon had knowingly allowed third-party sellers to offer items on the service in categories that Toys "R" Us had been granted exclusivity. In 2006, a court ruled in favor of Toys "R" Us, giving it the right to unwind its agreement with Amazon and establish its independent e-commerce website. The company was later awarded $51 million in damages.

In 2001, Amazon entered into a similar agreement with Borders Group, under which Amazon would comanage Borders.com as a co-branded service. Borders pulled out of the arrangement in 2007, with plans to also launch its own online store.

On October 18, 2011, Amazon.com announced a partnership with DC Comics for the exclusive digital rights to many popular comics, including Superman, Batman, Green Lantern, The Sandman, and Watchmen. The partnership has caused well-known bookstores like Barnes & Noble to remove these titles from their shelves.

In November 2013, Amazon announced a partnership with the United States Postal Service to begin delivering orders on Sundays. The service, included in Amazon's standard shipping rates, initiated in metropolitan areas of Los Angeles and New York because of the high-volume and inability to deliver in a timely way, with plans to expand into Dallas, Houston, New Orleans and Phoenix by 2014.

In June 2017, Nike agreed to sell products through Amazon in exchange for better policing of counterfeit goods. This proved unsuccessful and Nike withdrew from the partnership in November 2019. Companies including IKEA and Birkenstock also stopped selling through Amazon around the same time, citing similar frustrations over business practices and counterfeit goods.

In September 2017, Amazon ventured with one of its sellers JV Appario Retail owned by Patni Group which has recorded a total income of US$ 104.44 million (₹759  crore) in financial year 2017–2018.

, AmazonFresh sold a range of Booths branded products for home delivery in selected areas.

In November 2018, Amazon reached an agreement with Apple Inc. to sell selected products through the service, via the company and selected Apple Authorized Resellers. As a result of this partnership, only Apple Authorized Resellers may sell Apple products on Amazon effective January 4, 2019.

Private-label products 

Amazon sells many products under its own brand names, including phone chargers, batteries, and diaper wipes. The AmazonBasics brand was introduced in 2009, and now features hundreds of product lines, including smartphone cases, computer mice, batteries, dumbbells, and dog crates. Amazon owned 34 private-label brands as of 2019. These brands account for 0.15% of Amazon's global sales, whereas the average for other large retailers is 18%. Other Amazon retail brands include Presto!, Mama Bear, and Amazon Essentials.

Third-party sellers 
Amazon derives many of its sales (around 40% in 2008) from third-party sellers who sell products on Amazon. Some other large e-commerce sellers use Amazon to sell their products in addition to selling them through their websites. The sales are processed through Amazon.com and end up at individual sellers for processing and order fulfillment and Amazon leases space for these retailers. Small sellers of used and new goods go to Amazon Marketplace to offer goods at a fixed price.

Affiliate program 
Publishers can signup as affiliates and receive a commission for referring customers to Amazon by placing links to Amazon on their websites if the referral results in a sale. Worldwide, Amazon has "over 900,000 members" in its affiliate programs. In the middle of 2014, the Amazon Affiliate Program is used by 1.2% of all websites and it is the second most popular advertising network after Google Ads. It is frequently used by websites and non-profits to provide a way for supporters to earn them a commission.

Associates can access the Amazon catalog directly on their websites by using the Amazon Web Services (AWS) XML service. A new affiliate product, aStore, allows Associates to embed a subset of Amazon products within another website, or linked to another website. In June 2010, Amazon Seller Product Suggestions was launched to provide more transparency to sellers by recommending specific products to third-party sellers to sell on Amazon. Products suggested are based on customers' browsing history.

Product reviews 

Amazon allows users to submit reviews to the web page of each product. Reviewers must rate the product on a rating scale from one to five stars. Amazon provides a badging option for reviewers which indicates the real name of the reviewer (based on confirmation of a credit card account) or which indicates that the reviewer is one of the top reviewers by popularity. As of December 16, 2020, Amazon removed the ability of sellers and customers to comment on product reviews and purged their websites of all posted product review comments. In an email to sellers Amazon gave its rationale for removing this feature: "... the comments feature on customer reviews was rarely used." The remaining review response options are to indicate whether the reader finds the review helpful or to report that it violates Amazon policies (abuse). If a review is given enough "helpful" hits, it appears on the front page of the product. In 2010, Amazon was reported as being the largest single source of Internet consumer reviews.

When publishers asked Bezos why Amazon would publish negative reviews, he defended the practice by claiming that Amazon.com was "taking a different approach ... we want to make every book available—the good, the bad and the ugly ... to let truth loose".

There have been cases of positive reviews being written and posted by public relations companies on behalf of their clients and instances of writers using pseudonyms to leave negative reviews of their rivals' works

Amazon sales rank 
The Amazon sales rank (ASR) indicates the popularity of a product sold on any Amazon locale. It is a relative indicator of popularity that is updated hourly. Effectively, it is a "best sellers list" for the millions of products stocked by Amazon. While the ASR has no direct effect on the sales of a product, it is used by Amazon to determine which products to include in its bestsellers lists. Products that appear in these lists enjoy additional exposure on the Amazon website and this may lead to an increase in sales. In particular, products that experience large jumps (up or down) in their sales ranks may be included within Amazon's lists of "movers and shakers"; such a listing provides additional exposure that might lead to an increase in sales. For competitive reasons, Amazon does not release actual sales figures to the public. However, Amazon has now begun to release point of sale data via the Nielsen BookScan service to verified authors. While the ASR has been the source of much speculation by publishers, manufacturers, and marketers, Amazon itself does not release the details of its sales rank calculation algorithm. Some companies have analyzed Amazon sales data to generate sales estimates based on the ASR, though Amazon states:

Physical stores 
In November 2015, Amazon opened a physical Amazon Books store in University Village in Seattle. The store is 5,500 square feet and prices for all products match those on its website. Amazon opened its tenth physical book store in 2017; media speculation suggests that Amazon plans to eventually roll out 300 to 400 bookstores around the country.

In June 2018, it was reported that Amazon planned to open brick and mortar bookstores in Germany.

In August 2019, Amazon applied to have a liquor store in San Francisco, CA as a means to ship beer and alcohol within the city.

In 2020, Amazon Fresh opened several physical stores in the U.S. and the United Kingdom.

Hardware and services 
Amazon has a number of products and services available, including its digital assistant Alexa, Amazon Music and Prime Video for music and videos respectively, the Amazon Appstore for Android apps, and its Kindle hardware line of e-readers and tablets. Audible provides audiobooks for purchase and listening.

In September 2021, Amazon announced the launch of Astro, its first household robot, powered by its Alexa smart home technology. This can be remote-controlled when not at home, to check on pets, people, or home security. It will send owners a notification if it detects something unusual.

In January 2023, Amazon announced the launch of RXPass, a prescription drug delivery service. It allows US Amazon Prime members to pay a $5 monthly fee for access to 60 medications. The service was launched immediately after the announcement except in states with specific prescription delivery requirements. Beneficiaries of government healthcare programs such as Medicare and Medicaid will not be able to sign up for RXPass.

Subsidiaries 

Amazon owns over 40 subsidiaries, including Amazon Web Services, Audible, Diapers.com, Goodreads, IMDb, Kiva Systems (now Amazon Robotics), Shopbop, Teachstreet, Twitch, Zappos, and Zoox.

Amazon Web Services

Amazon Web Services (AWS) is a subsidiary of that provides on-demand cloud computing platforms and APIs to individuals, companies, and governments, on a metered pay-as-you-go basis. These cloud computing web services provide distributed computing processing capacity and software tools via AWS server farms. As of 2021 Q4, AWS has 33% market share for cloud infrastructure while the next two competitors Microsoft Azure and Google Cloud have 21%, and 10% respectively, according to Synergy Group.

Audible 

Audible is a seller and producer of spoken audio entertainment, information, and educational programming on the Internet. Audible sells digital audiobooks, radio and television programs, and audio versions of magazines and newspapers. Through its production arm, Audible Studios, Audible has also become the world's largest producer of downloadable audiobooks. On January 31, 2008, Amazon announced it would buy Audible for about $300 million. The deal closed in March 2008 and Audible became a subsidiary of Amazon.

Goodreads

Goodreads is a "social cataloging" website founded in December 2006 and launched in January 2007 by Otis Chandler, a software engineer, and entrepreneur, and Elizabeth Khuri. The website allows individuals to freely search Goodreads' extensive user-populated database of books, annotations, and reviews. Users can sign up and register books to generate library catalogs and reading lists. They can also create their groups of book suggestions and discussions. In December 2007, the site had over 650,000 members, and over a million books had been added. Amazon bought the company in March 2013.

Ring

Ring is a home automation company founded by Jamie Siminoff in 2013. It is primarily known for its WiFi powered smart doorbells, but manufactures other devices such as security cameras. Amazon bought Ring for US$1 billion in 2018.

Twitch

Twitch is a live streaming platform for video, primarily oriented towards video gaming content. Twitch was acquired by Amazon in August 2014 for $970 million. The site's rapid growth had been boosted primarily by the prominence of major esports competitions on the service, leading GameSpot senior esports editor Rod Breslau to have described the service as "the ESPN of esports". , the service had over 1.5 million broadcasters and 100 million monthly viewers.

Whole Foods Market

Whole Foods Market is an American supermarket chain exclusively featuring foods without artificial preservatives, colors, flavors, sweeteners, and hydrogenated fats. Amazon acquired Whole Foods for $13.7 billion in August 2017.

Other 
Other Amazon subsidiaries include:

 A9.com, a company focused on researching and building innovative technology, has been a subsidiary since 2003. 
 Amazon Maritime, Inc. holds a Federal Maritime Commission license to operate as a non-vessel-owning common carrier (NVOCC), which enables the company to manage its shipments from China into the United States.
 Amazon Pharmacy is an online delivery service dedicated to prescription drugs, launched in November 2020. The service provides discounts up to 80% for generic drugs and up to 40% for branded drugs for Prime subscribe users. The products can be purchased on the company's website or at over 50,000 bricks-and-mortar pharmacies in the United States.
 Annapurna Labs, an Israel-based microelectronics company reputedly for US$350–370M acquired by Amazon Web Services in January 2015 .
 Beijing Century Joyo Courier Services, which applied for a freight forwarding license with the US Maritime Commission. Amazon is also building out its logistics in trucking and air freight to potentially compete with UPS and FedEx.
 Brilliance Audio, an audiobook publisher founded in 1984 by Michael Snodgrass in Grand Haven, Michigan. The company produced its first 8 audio titles in 1985. The company was purchased by Amazon in 2007 for an undisclosed amount. At the time of the acquisition, Brilliance was producing 12–15 new titles a month. It operates as an independent company within Amazon. In 1984, Brilliance Audio invented a technique for recording twice as much on the same cassette. The technique involved recording on each of the two channels of each stereo track. It has been credited with revolutionizing the burgeoning audiobook market in the mid-1980s since it made unabridged books affordable.
 ComiXology, a cloud-based digital comics platform with over 200 million comic downloads . It offers a selection of more than 40,000 comic books and graphic novels across Android, iOS, Fire OS and Windows 8 devices and over a web browser. Amazon bought the company in April 2014.
 CreateSpace,  which offers self-publishing services for independent content creators, publishers, film studios, and music labels, became a subsidiary in 2009.
 Eero, an electronics company specializing in mesh-networking Wifi devices founded as a startup in 2014 by Nick Weaver, Amos Schallich, and Nate Hardison to simplify and innovate the smart home. Eero was acquired by Amazon in 2019 for US$97 million. Eero has continued to operate under its banner and advertises its commitment to privacy despite early concerns from the company's acquisition.
 Health Navigator is a startup developing APIs for online health services acquired in October 2019. The startup will form part of Amazon Care, which is the company's employee healthcare service. This follows the 2018 purchase of PillPack for under $1 billion, which has also been included into Amazon Care.
 Junglee, a former online shopping service provided by Amazon that enabled customers to search for products from online and offline retailers in India. Junglee started as a virtual database that was used to extract information from the Internet and deliver it to enterprise applications. As it progressed, Junglee started to use its database technology to create a single window marketplace on the Internet by making every item from every supplier available for purchase. Web shoppers could locate, compare and transact millions of products from across the Internet shopping mall through one window. Amazon acquired Junglee in 1998, and the website Junglee.com was launched in India in February 2012 as a comparison-shopping website. It curated and enabled searching for a diverse variety of products such as clothing, electronics, toys, jewelry, and video games, among others, across thousands of online and offline sellers. Millions of products are browsable, the client selects a price, and then they are directed to a seller. In November 2017, Amazon closed down Junglee.com and the former domain currently redirects to Amazon India.
 Kuiper Systems, is a subsidiary of Amazon, set up to deploy a broadband satellite internet constellation with an announced 3,236 Low Earth orbit satellites to provide satellite based Internet connectivity.
 Lab126, developers of integrated consumer electronics such as the Kindle, became a subsidiary in 2004.
 Shelfari, a former social cataloging website for books. Shelfari users built virtual bookshelves of the titles which they owned or had read and they could rate, review, tag and discuss their books. Users could also create groups that other members could join, create discussions and talk about books, or other topics. Recommendations could be sent to friends on the site for what books to read. Amazon bought the company in August 2008. Shelfari continued to function as an independent book social network within the Amazon until January 2016, when Amazon announced that it would be merging Shelfari with Goodreads and closing down Shelfari.
 Souq, the former largest e-commerce platform in the Arab world. The company launched in 2005 in Dubai, United Arab Emirates and served multiple areas across the Middle East. On March 28, 2017, Amazon acquired Souq.com for $580 million. The company was re-branded as Amazon and its infrastructure was used to expand Amazon's online platform in the Middle East.

Amazon also has investments in renewable energy and plans to expand its position into the Canadian market through an investment in a new plant in Alberta.

Operations

Logistics 

Amazon uses many different transportation services to deliver packages. Amazon-branded services include:
 Amazon Air, a cargo airline for bulk transport, with last-mile delivery handled either by Amazon Flex, Amazon Logistics, or the U.S. Postal Service.
 Amazon Flex, a smartphone app that enables individuals to act as independent contractors, delivering packages to customers from personal vehicles without uniforms. Deliveries include one or two hours Prime Now, same or next day Amazon Fresh groceries, and standard Amazon.com orders, in addition to orders from local stores that contract with Amazon.
 Amazon Logistics, in which Amazon contracts with small businesses (which it calls "Delivery Service Partners") to perform deliveries to customers. Each business has a fleet of approximately 20–40 Amazon-branded vans, and employees of the contractors wear Amazon uniforms. As of December 2020, it operates in the United States, Canada, Italy, Germany, Spain, and the United Kingdom.
 Amazon Prime Air is an experimental drone delivery service.

Amazon directly employs people to work at its warehouses, bulk distribution centers, staffed "Amazon Hub Locker+" locations, and delivery stations where drivers pick up packages. As of December 2020, it is not hiring delivery drivers as employees.

Rakuten Intelligence estimated that in 2020 in the United States, the proportion of last-mile deliveries was 56% by Amazon's directly contracted services (mostly in urban areas), 30% by the U.S. Postal Service (mostly in rural areas), and 14% by UPS. In April 2021, Amazon reported to investors it had increased its in-house delivery capacity by 50% in the last 12 months (which included the first year of the COVID-19 pandemic in the United States).

Supply chain 
Amazon first launched its distribution network in 1997 with two fulfillment centers in Seattle and New Castle, Delaware. Amazon has several types of distribution facilities consisting of cross-dock centers, fulfillment centers, sortation centers, delivery stations, Prime now hubs, and Prime air hubs. There are 75 fulfillment centers and 25 sortation centers with over 125,000 employees. Employees are responsible for five basic tasks: unpacking and inspecting incoming goods; placing goods in storage and recording their location; picking goods from their computer recorded locations to make up an individual shipment; sorting and packing orders; and shipping. A computer that records the location of goods and maps out routes for pickers plays a key role: employees carry hand-held computers which communicate with the central computer and monitor their rate of progress. Some warehouses are partially automated with systems built by Amazon Robotics.

In September 2006, Amazon launched a program called FBA (Fulfillment By Amazon) whereby it could handle storage, packing and distribution of products and services for small sellers.

Corporate affairs

Board of directors 

, Amazon's board of directors were:
 Jeff Bezos, executive chairman, Amazon.com, Inc.
 Andy Jassy, president and CEO, Amazon.com, Inc.
 Keith B. Alexander, CEO of IronNet Cybersecurity, former NSA director
 Edith W. Cooper, co-founder of Medley and former EVP of Goldman Sachs
 Jamie Gorelick, partner, Wilmer Cutler Pickering Hale and Dorr
 Daniel P. Huttenlocher, dean of the Schwarzman College of Computing, Massachusetts Institute of Technology
 Judy McGrath, former CEO, MTV Networks
 Indra Nooyi, former CEO, PepsiCo
 Jon Rubinstein, former chairman and CEO, Palm, Inc.
 Patty Stonesifer, president and CEO, Martha's Table
 Wendell P. Weeks, chairman, president and CEO, Corning Inc.

Finances 
Amazon.com is primarily a retail site with a sales revenue model; Amazon takes a small percentage of the sale price of each item that is sold through its website while also allowing companies to advertise their products by paying to be listed as featured products. , Amazon.com is ranked eighth on the Fortune 500 rankings of the largest United States corporations by total revenue.

For the fiscal year 2021, Amazon reported earnings of US$33.36 billion, with an annual revenue of US$469.82 billion, an increase of 21.7% over the previous fiscal cycle. Since 2007 sales increased from 14.835 billion to 469.822 billion, due to continued business expansion.

Amazon's market capitalization went over US$1 trillion again in early February 2020 after the announcement of the fourth quarter 2019 results.

Corporate culture 
During his tenure, Jeff Bezos had become renowned for his annual shareholder letters, which have gained similar notability to those of Warren Buffett. These annual letters gave an "invaluable window" into the famously "secretive" company, and revealed Bezos's perspectives and strategic focus. A common theme of these letters is Bezos's desire to instill customer-centricity (in his words, "customer obsession") at all levels of Amazon, notably by making all senior executives field customer support queries for a short time at Amazon call centers. He also read many emails addressed by customers to his public email address. One of Bezos's most well-known internal memos was his mandate for "all teams" to "expose their data and functionality" through service interfaces "designed from the ground up to be externalizable". This process, commonly known as a service-oriented architecture (SOA), resulted in mandatory dogfooding of services that would later be commercialized as part of AWS.

Lobbying
Amazon lobbies the United States federal government and state governments on multiple issues such as the enforcement of sales taxes on online sales, transportation safety, privacy and data protection and intellectual property. According to regulatory filings, Amazon.com focuses its lobbying on the United States Congress, the Federal Communications Commission and the Federal Reserve. Amazon.com spent roughly $3.5 million, $5 million and $9.5 million on lobbying, in 2013, 2014 and 2015, respectively. In 2019, it spent $16.8 million and had a team of 104 lobbyists.

Amazon.com was a corporate member of the American Legislative Exchange Council (ALEC) until it dropped membership following protests at its shareholders' meeting on May 24, 2012.

In 2014, Amazon expanded its lobbying practices as it prepared to lobby the Federal Aviation Administration to approve its drone delivery program, hiring the Akin Gump Strauss Hauer & Feld lobbying firm in June. Amazon and its lobbyists have visited with Federal Aviation Administration officials and aviation committees in Washington, D.C. to explain its plans to deliver packages. In September 2020 this moved one step closer with the granting of a critical certificate by the FAA.

Criticism 

Amazon has attracted criticism for its actions, including: supplying law enforcement with facial recognition surveillance tools; forming cloud computing partnerships with the CIA; leading customers away from bookshops; adversely impacting the environment; placing a low priority on warehouse conditions for workers; actively opposing unionization efforts; remotely deleting content purchased by Amazon Kindle users; taking public subsidies; seeking to patent its 1-Click technology; engaging in anti-competitive actions and price discrimination; and reclassifying LGBT books as adult content. Criticism has also concerned various decisions over whether to censor or publish content such as the WikiLeaks website, works containing libel and material facilitating dogfight, cockfight, or pedophile activities. In December 2011, Amazon faced a backlash from small businesses for running a one-day deal to promote its new Price Check app. Shoppers who used the app to check prices in a brick-and-mortar store were offered a 5% discount to purchase the same item from Amazon. Companies like Groupon, eBay and Taap.it countered Amazon's promotion by offering $10 off from their products.

The company has also faced accusations of putting undue pressure on suppliers to maintain and extend its profitability. One effort to squeeze the most vulnerable book publishers was known within the company as the Gazelle Project, after Bezos suggested, according to Brad Stone, "that Amazon should approach these small publishers the way a cheetah would pursue a sickly gazelle." In July 2014, the Federal Trade Commission launched a lawsuit against the company alleging it was promoting in-app purchases to children, which were being transacted without parental consent. In 2019, Amazon banned selling skin-lightening and racist products that might affect the consumer's health. In 2022, a lawsuit filed by state attorney-general Letitia James was dismissed by the New York state court of appeals.

See also 

 Amazon Breakthrough Novel Award
 Amazon Pay
 Amazon Standard Identification Number (ASIN)
 Camelcamelcamel – a website that tracks the prices of products sold on Amazon.com
 History of Amazon
 Internal carbon pricing
 List of book distributors
 Statistically improbable phrases – Amazon.com's phrase extraction technique for indexing books

References

Further reading

External links 

 
 

 
1994 establishments in Washington (state)
1997 initial public offerings
3D publishing
American companies established in 1994
Android (operating system) software
Arts and crafts retailers
Bookstores of the United States
Cloud computing providers
Companies listed on the Nasdaq
Ebook suppliers
Internet properties established in 1994
IOS software
Logistics companies of the United States
Mobile phone manufacturers
Multinational companies headquartered in the United States
Online music stores of the United States
Online retailers of the United States
Retail companies established in 1994
Self-publishing companies
Software companies based in Seattle
Software companies established in 1994
Software companies of the United States
Technology companies established in 1994
Transportation companies based in Washington (state)
TvOS software
Universal Windows Platform apps
Webby Award winners